This article is about the particular significance of the year 1864 to Wales and its people.

Incumbents

Lord Lieutenant of Anglesey – Henry Paget, 2nd Marquess of Anglesey 
Lord Lieutenant of Brecknockshire – John Lloyd Vaughan Watkins
Lord Lieutenant of Caernarvonshire – Sir Richard Williams-Bulkeley, 10th Baronet 
Lord Lieutenant of Cardiganshire – Edward Pryse
Lord Lieutenant of Carmarthenshire – John Campbell, 2nd Earl Cawdor 
Lord Lieutenant of Denbighshire – Robert Myddelton Biddulph   
Lord Lieutenant of Flintshire – Sir Stephen Glynne, 9th Baronet
Lord Lieutenant of Glamorgan – Christopher Rice Mansel Talbot
Lord Lieutenant of Merionethshire – Edward Lloyd-Mostyn, 2nd Baron Mostyn 
Lord Lieutenant of Monmouthshire – Benjamin Hall, 1st Baron Llanover
Lord Lieutenant of Montgomeryshire – Sudeley Hanbury-Tracy, 3rd Baron Sudeley 
Lord Lieutenant of Pembrokeshire – William Edwardes, 3rd Baron Kensington 
Lord Lieutenant of Radnorshire – John Walsh, 1st Baron Ormathwaite
Bishop of Bangor – James Colquhoun Campbell 
Bishop of Llandaff – Alfred Ollivant 
Bishop of St Asaph – Thomas Vowler Short 
Bishop of St Davids – Connop Thirlwall

Events
June - David Lloyd George's father dies and his family move from Pembrokeshire to Llanystumdwy to be cared for by his maternal uncle, Richard Lloyd, when he is aged 18 months.
June 23 - Aberystwyth is linked to the rail network for the first time.
October 6 - The Denbigh, Ruthin and Corwen Railway is completed throughout to Corwen.
David Davies Llandinam takes a lease of coal in the Upper Rhondda Valley and sinks the Parc and Maindy pits.
Opening of Rhosydd Quarry narrow gauge railway incline on the upper Croesor Tramway at the head of the Croesor valley.
The Llandudno Improvement Commissioners attempt to ban Punch and Judy shows. In this year, the town first receives the title "Queen of Welsh Resorts".

Arts and literature

Awards
National Eisteddfod of Wales is held at Llandudno. The chair is won by Richard Foulkes Edwards (Rhisiart Ddu o Wynedd).

New books

English language
R. D. Blackmore - Clara Vaughan
Sir John Henry Philipps - Lyrics
Alfred Russel Wallace - The Origin of Human Races and the Antiquity of Man Deduced from the Theory of Natural Selection
Frances Williams-Wynn - Diaries of a Lady of Quality (posthumously published)

Welsh language
Huw Derfel - Llawlyfr Carnedd Llywelyn
Robert Jones Derfel - Traethodau ac Areithiau
Daniel Silvan Evans (ed.) - Y Marchog Crwydrad: Hen Ffuglith Gymreig

Music
William Griffiths (Ifander) - Gwarchae Harlech (cantata)

Sport
Cricket
South Wales Cricket Club play Gentlemen of Sussex. The South Wales team includes W. G. Grace, who scores 170.
Football
October 22 - The predecessor of Wrexham A.F.C. plays its first match, making it the oldest association football club in Wales and the world's sixth oldest football club.

Births
January 8
Prince Albert Victor, first child of the Prince and Princess of Wales (died 1892)
Thomas Allen Glenn, soldier and historian (died 1948)
February 7 - Alfred Augustus Mathews, vicar and Wales international rugby player (died 1946)
March 11 - John Silas Evans, astronomer (died 1953)
May 4 - Harry Bowen, Wales international rugby player (died 1913)
June 5 - Edward Pegge, Wales international rugby player (died 1915)
July 5 - Lloyd Kenyon, 4th Baron Kenyon (died 1927)
August 19 - Charles Alfred Howell Green, first Bishop of Monmouth (died 1944)
September 15
 Fred Andrews, Wales international rugby player (died 1929)
 Giotto Griffiths, Wales international rugby player (died 1938)
September 21 - Ernest Rowland, priest and Wales international rugby player (died 1940)
October 10
Edward Bishop - Wales International rugby union player (died 1919)
Arthur Gould - Wales International rugby union captain (died 1919)
October 17 - Sir John Morris-Jones, grammarian (died 1929)
November 4 - Margaret Owen, later wife of David Lloyd George (died 1941)

Deaths
March 11 - Richard Roberts, engineer, 74
March 28 - Ellis Evans, Baptist minister and author, 77
June 18
Evan Davies, missionary, 59
William Smith O'Brien, Irish nationalist, 60 (in Bangor)
June 20 - John Davies (Brychan), poet, 79
July 24 - Lloyd Kenyon, 3rd Baron Kenyon, 59
August 1 - Thomas Rees, Unitarian minister (born 1777)
December 29 - Mary Jones, early owner of a Welsh Bible, 80

References